Saima can be a Pakistani first name of Arabic origin or Finnish feminine first name. People named Saima include:
Saima Noor (often billed as Saima, born 1967), Pakistani film actress
Saima Mohsin, freelance journalist
Saima Harmaja, Finnish poet and writer

See also
 Saima (1844–1846), a Swedish language newspaper in Finland
 Saimaa, a lake in southeastern Finland

Pakistani feminine given names
Finnish feminine given names